Swan Lake (formerly Stevensville) is a hamlet (and census designated place) in the town of Liberty in Sullivan County, New York, United States. Swan Lake has a post office with ZIP code 12783, which opened on January 2, 1849.

Swan Lake is the destination of New York State Route 17's exit 101.

History 
Swan Lake was originally called Stevensville, named after the Stevens brothers who built a large sole leather tannery there. The tannery was in existence until about 1873.

Since the 1880s the Swan Lake area has been noted for its hotel and tourist industry. Many of the local farm girls found jobs there in the early 1900s. The lake has always had an abundance of fish and brings sportsmen into the area.

Alden S. Swan arrived there from New York about 1895 and by the time of his death in 1917 owned much of the land and all of the lake. The name was changed to Swan Lake in January 1927.

The Swan estate was purchased by Siegel and Kretchmer and the Siegels went on to build the Commodore and Stevensville the latter developing into a large sprawling hotel run by the Dinnerstein family.

The Bikur Cholim B'nai Israel Synagogue  was listed on the National Register of Historic Places in 1999.

Jewish summer camps 
Swan Lake is home to many Jewish summer camps. Some of these are Camp Chipinaw, Silver Lake Camp, Pupa and Camp Toras Chesed.

See also 
 New York State Route 55
 New York State Route 17B

References 

Hamlets in Sullivan County, New York
Hamlets in New York (state)